Sportovní hala Vodova is an indoor sporting arena located in Brno, Czech Republic.  The capacity of the arena is 3,000 spectators and hosted some matches from the 2010 FIBA World Championship for Women.  It hosts indoor sporting events such as basketball, volleyball, and boxing.

An old hall is built next to this hall with a capacity of 1,000.

References

Indoor arenas in the Czech Republic
Buildings and structures in Brno
Sport in Brno
Basketball venues in the Czech Republic
Volleyball venues in the Czech Republic
Badminton venues
1975 establishments in Czechoslovakia
Sports venues completed in 1975
20th-century architecture in the Czech Republic